Seniūnaitija (literally "sub-eldership") is the lowest level administrative-territorial unit in Lithuania. Seniūnaitija is led by a seniūnaitis who represents communities of inhabited places. Seniūnaitis are elected for a 2-year tenure. 
A legal change on 15 September 2008 first allowed the establishment of sub-elderships.  The first sub-elderships established by municipalities appeared in November and December 2008, and by 2009, the majority of municipalities had established sub-elderships.

See also
 Administrative divisions of Lithuania
 Counties (Lithuanian: singular – apskritis, plural – apskritys)
 Municipalities (Lithuanian: plural – savivaldybės, singular – savivaldybė)
 Elderships (or wards) (eldership, ward) (Lithuanian: plural – seniūnijos, singular – seniūnija).
 Cities (Lithuanian: plural – miestai, singular – miestas)
 Towns (Lithuanian: plural – miesteliai, singular – miestelis)

External links
 Changed Local Self-Government Law (lithuanian)

Subdivisions of Lithuania